"Fortune favours the bold", "Fortune favours the brave" and "Fortune favours the strong" are common translations of a Latin proverb. The slogan has been used historically by people in the military in the Anglosphere, and it is used up to the present on the coats of arms of individual families and clans.

Background 

This last form is used by Turnus, an antagonist in the Aeneid by Virgil. Fortuna refers to luck or its personification, a Roman goddess.

Another version of the proverb, was used in Terence's 151 BC comedy play Phormio, line 203. Ovid further parodies the phrase at I.608 of his didactic work, Ars Amatoria, writing "audentem Forsque Venusque iuvat" or "Venus, like Fortune, favors the bold."

Pliny the Younger quotes his uncle, Pliny the Elder, as using the phrase  when deciding to take his fleet and investigate the eruption of Mount Vesuvius in AD 79, in the hope of helping his friend Pomponianus: Fortes' inquit 'fortuna iuvat: Pomponianum pete. (Fortune', he said, 'favours the brave: head for Pomponianus.) Pliny the Elder ultimately died during the expedition.

The Latin phrase Fortuna Eruditis Favet ("fortune favours the prepared mind") is also used. Louis Pasteur, the French microbiologist and chemist, made this remark: "Dans les champs de l'observation le hasard ne favorise que les esprits préparés", meaning "In the fields of observation, chance favours only the prepared mind."

The proverb may be a rewording of a line by Democritus that "boldness is the beginning of action, but fortune controls how it ends".

Historical examples

Poland
The motto is used by the 6th Airborne Brigade (Poland).

Australia
'Virtutis Fortuna Comes' (Fortune is the companion of virtue) is the Unit motto of the 12th/16th Hunter River Lancers; an Army Reserve unit based in Northern New South Wales (The Hunter River region, hence the name) and South-East Queensland.

Brazil
The motto for the GRUMEC (Brazilian navy's special group) and COMANDOS ANFÍBIOS (Brazilian Marines Special Operations group) is "Fortuna Audaces Sequitur" (Fortune follows the brave – A sorte acompanha os audazes).

Denmark
The quote "Fortes Fortuna Juvat is used by the Jydske Dragonregiment, or Jutish Dragoon Regiment, in the Royal Danish Army.

Italy 
The quote "Audentes fortuna iuvat appears in the University of Milano Bicocca logo.

Malaysia
"Fortuna Eruditis Favet is the motto of Sunway University and Sunway College.

Netherlands
The motto is used by the Cornielje family of The Netherlands alongside their coat of arms.

Portugal
The motto for the Portuguese Commandos is "Audaces Fortuna Juvat (A sorte protege os Audazes).

Romania 
"audaces fortuna juvat" is the motto of the Naval Special Operations Forces known as FNOS or GNFOS.

South Korea 
Motto used by the 80th Fighter Squadron stationed at Kunsan AB, Republic of South Korea.

Sri Lanka 
The Motto is used by the Special Boat Squadron (Sri Lanka).

United Kingdom
Because it was the motto of the Duke of Wellington, Earl of Mornington, Virtutis Fortuna Comes is used as the motto for the British Army's Yorkshire Regiment having been previously used by one of the Yorkshire's antecedent regiments, the Duke of Wellington's Regiment (West Riding [33rd/76th Foot]). It is also the motto for Wellington College, Berkshire.

A number of armigerous families use this motto, often featured on their coats of arms; these families include Clan MacKinnon, Clan Turnbull, and several Dickson families, including a number resident in Forfarshire, and the Dickson Barons Islington.

The phrase was used as the motto of the Royal Air Force station based at East Fortune, in East Lothian. The base was operational in the First World War and between 1940 and 1947.

It is the motto of the football club Linfield F.C. in Belfast.

It is also the motto of Liverpool John Moores University.

The Latin equivalent "Fortuna audentes juvat is used as the motto for the Turing family, dating back to 1316 AD.

Ireland
The O'Flaherty clan has historically used the phrase "Fortuna Favet Fortibus" as a motto.

The O'Keeffe family motto is “Forti et fideli nihil difficile” which translates as “For the brave and faithful, nothing is difficult”.

The Duke of Wellington, Arthur Wellesley, Earl of Mornington, also shared the motto "Virtutis Fortuna Comes".

United States 

As "Fortes Fortuna Juvat it appears on the crest of the 3rd Marine Regiment at Kaneohe Bay, Hawaii.

It is on the seal of the Joint Maritime Training Center, known in the United States Coast Guard as the Special Missions Training Center.

It is the official motto of the United States Coast Guard Academy Class of 1982.

"Fortuna Favet Fortibus ("Fortune favors the brave") is the official motto of the United States Naval Academy Classes of 1985, 2004, and 2012.

"Audaces Fortuna Juvat" is the official motto of the United States Naval Academy Class of 1992.

The motto "Fortes Fortuna Juvat appears on the gates of Honor Hill at Ft. Benning, Georgia.

It has been the motto of several United States Navy ships:

 USNS Carl Brashear (T-AKE-7). The motto appears on the ship's insignia.
 USS La Jolla (SSN-701)
 , after her conversion from an SSBN to a SSGN.
 
 

The motto is used by the 366th Fighter Wing of the United States Air Force and appears on the wing patch. The motto is also used by the Air Force Office of Special Investigations, 3rd Field Investigation Region, Detachment 327, Little Rock Air Force Base.

"Audentes Fortuna Juvat is the motto of the 80th Fighter Squadron (The Headhunters) stationed out of Kunsan Air Base, Republic of Korea.

It is the unit motto for 2nd Battalion, 3rd Marines, stationed out of Marine Corps Base Hawaii.

It is the unit motto for 3rd Battalion, 8th Marines, stationed out of Marine Corps Camp Lejeune, NC.

The motto is also used on the Seattle Police Department's SWAT unit patch.

It is the squadron motto for US Navy Growler Squadron VAQ-209, stationed at NAS Whidbey Island, WA.

"Fortuna favet audaci is the motto of Trumbull College of Yale University.

During the American Civil War, the Confederate States of America Army's 7th Alabama Cavalry displayed "Fortuna Favet Fortibus" on its flag.

In 2021, Matt Damon appeared in an advertisement for Crypto.com encouraging investors using the proverb as a slogan. The advertisement was widely criticized, and it was frequently satirized by the animated series South Park, beginning in its twenty-fifth season.

In popular culture 
In the movies John Wick and John Wick: Chapter 2, the title character bears a tattoo across his upper back reading "FORTIS FORTUNA ADIUVAT".

See also 
 God helps those who help themselves
 Who Dares Wins

References

External links

Latin proverbs
Fortuna